Claudin-14 is a protein that in humans is encoded by the CLDN14 gene. It belongs to a related family of proteins called claudins.

The protein encoded by CLDN14 is an integral membrane protein and a component of tight junctions, one mode of cell-to-cell adhesion in epithelial or endothelial cell sheets. Tight junctions form continuous seals around cells and serve as a physical barrier to prevent solutes and water from passing freely through the paracellular space.

These junctions are composed of sets of continuous networking protein strands in the outer surface of the cell membrane, with complementary grooves in the inwardly facing extracytoplasmic leaflet.  The CLDN14 protein also binds to WW domain of Yes-associated protein.

Defects in CLDN14 are the cause of an autosomal recessive form of nonsyndromic sensorineural deafness. Two transcript variants encoding the same protein have been found for this gene.

There are also suggestions that CLDN14 plays a role in tumour angiogenesis (blood vessel formation), as deletion of a single copy of this gene leads to tight junction defects and leaky blood vessels in a mouse model.

See also 
 Nonsyndromic deafness

References

External links

Further reading

 

 Sticky cells, blood vessels and cancer – the paradox of Claudin-14 - Marianne Baker, Cancer Research UK Science Update blog, 14 June 2013